Christopher Looby is an American literary critic specializing in 18th and 19th century American literature. He is a Professor of English at UCLA.

Background
Looby received his B.A. from Washington University in St. Louis in 1979 and his Ph.D. from Columbia University in 1989.

Select publications
 "Introduction." Sheppard Lee: Written By Himself by Robert Montgomery Bird. New York: New York Review of Books, 2008. xv-xliii.
The Complete Civil War Journal and Selected Letters of Thomas Wentworth Higginson. Chicago: Univ. of Chicago Press, 2000.
Voicing America: Language, Literary Form, and the Origins of the United States. Chicago: Univ. of Chicago Press, 1996.

Notes

External links
Official website - UCLA
Christopher Looby in the New York Review of Books

American literary critics
Literary critics of English
University of California, Los Angeles faculty
Columbia University alumni
Washington University in St. Louis alumni
Living people
Year of birth missing (living people)